ASCO (Automatic Switch Company) Power Technologies, a business unit of Schneider Electric, makes electrical equipment used in healthcare facilities, data centers, communication networks, commercial buildings, and industrial plants.

ASCO also includes a Services branch, providing maintenance programs, modifications, upgrades, and emergency repairs. The "Firetrol" branch of ASCO provides power transfer switches, controls, and alarms for fire suppression. ASCO's headquarters is located in Florham Park, New Jersey. With over 1400 employees and 500,000 square feet of manufacturing floor space, it is the world's largest manufacturer of power transfer switches.

ASCO Power Technologies was founded in 1888 and developed the first commercially available automatic transfer switch in 1920.

November 1, 2017, ASCO Power Technologies was sold by Vertiv to Schneider Electric for $1.25 billion.

History

References

Companies based in Morris County, New Jersey
Schneider Electric